During the 1994–95 season Valencia CF competed in La Liga and Copa del Rey

Summary
During summer new President Francisco Roig appointed Brazilian and recently 1994 FIFA World Cup Champion Carlos Alberto Parreira as new manager. Also, the club transferred in several players such as Russian striker Oleg Salenko,  Vicente Engonga, 1994 FIFA World Cup Winner  Mazinho from Palmeiras also from FC Barcelona arrived International Goalkeeper Andoni Zubizarreta and defender Juan Carlos Rodríguez. The team collapsed in League to the 10th spot never placing in European classification zone and Parreira left the club before the end of the season. Meanwhile, with Rielo as new manager in Copa del Rey the squad reached the Final  for the first time since 1979 being defeated by Deportivo La Coruña with a 1–2 score.

Squad

Transfers

Competitions

La Liga

League table

Position by round

Matches

Copa del Rey

Round 3

Round 4

Eightfinals

Quarterfinals

Semifinals

Final

Replay

Statistics

Players statistics

References

Valencia CF seasons
Valencia